Eodorcadion humerale is a species of beetle in the family Cerambycidae. It was described by Gebler in 1823. It is known from Mongolia.

Subspecies
 Eodorcadion humerale humerale (Gebler, 1823)
 Eodorcadion humerale impluviatum (Faldermann, 1833)
 Eodorcadion humerale trabeatum (Jakovlev, 1901)

References

Dorcadiini
Beetles described in 1823